Makhdoomzada Syed Hussain Raza Shah is a Pakistani politician who had been member of the Provincial Assembly of the Punjab between 2002 and 2007.

Political career

He was elected to the Provincial Assembly of the Punjab as a candidate of Pakistan Muslim League (Q) (PML-Q) from Constituency PP-123 (Toba Tek Singh-VI) in 2002 Pakistani general election.

References

Living people
Punjab MPAs 2002–2007
Pakistan Muslim League (Q) MPAs (Punjab)
Year of birth missing (living people)